Dogwood Stable is an American Thoroughbred racehorse partnership founded in 1969 by W. Cothran "Cot" Campbell of Aiken, South Carolina.The pioneers of thoroughbred partnerships, the operation's stated policy is to acquire moderately priced, young horses. According to their website, since inception, Campbell has introduced more than 1,200 people to the sport of Thoroughbred racing, and Dogwood partnerships have raced more than 70 stakes winners. In 1990, their colt Summer Squall won the second leg of the U.S. Triple Crown series, the Preakness Stakes. In 2013, they won the Belmont Stakes with the colt Palace Malice.

Successful Dogwood Stable runners include Nassipour, Southjet, Smok'n Frolic, and Limehouse. The partnership has also raced two Champions:
 Storm Song - won the 1996 Breeders' Cup Juvenile Fillies and was voted the Eclipse Award as the American Champion Two-Year-Old Filly. 
 Inlander - won the 1987 Colonial Cup Steeplechase and was voted American Steeplechase Horse of the Year.

References
 Dogwood Stable website

See also
 Dogwood Dominion Award

American racehorse owners and breeders
Owners of Preakness Stakes winners
Partnerships
American companies established in 1969